Jens Byggmark (born 22 August 1985) is a Swedish former World Cup alpine ski racer who specialised in the technical events of slalom and giant slalom.

Byggmark was born in Örebro but was raised in Tärnaby. He raced for Tärna IK Fjällvinden, the world's most successful ski club. He made his debut in the European Cup in 2005.

Byggmark has Sámi roots on his mother's side. He has two children, a daughter and a son, together with his wife, Michaela Delér.

World Cup
Byggmark made his World Cup debut in 2005, and has won two slalom events, both during the 2007 season, on successive days at Kitzbühel, Austria. Two days later, he placed second in the slalom at Schladming, Austria.

After having struggled for some years with poor results and bad starting positions, Byggmark made a strong comeback during the 2011 season and for two seasons he had a place in the first start group.  In September 2013, he suffered a knee injury and missed the 2014 season, including the Olympic Games.

World Cup results

Season standings

Race podiums
 2 wins – (2 SL)      
 8 podiums – (8 SL)

World Championship results

Olympic results

References

External links

 
 Jens Byggmark World Cup standings at the International Ski Federation
 
 
 
 
 
 

1985 births
Swedish male alpine skiers
Alpine skiers at the 2010 Winter Olympics
Olympic alpine skiers of Sweden
People from Storuman Municipality
Sportspeople from Örebro
Living people
Tärna IK Fjällvinden skiers
Swedish Sámi sportspeople
People from Tärnaby